Zachos is both a surname and a given name. Notable people with the name include:

People with the surname
John Celivergos Zachos (1820-1898), Greek-American educator and elocutionist
Helena Zachos (1856–1951), American educator and elocutionist, daughter of John Celivergos Zachos
Stathis Zachos (born 1947), Greek computer scientist
Cosmas Zachos (born 1951), American physicist
Vanessa Zachos, British actor
Dimitris Zachos, Greek singer

People with the given name
Zachos Milios (1805–1860), Greek revolutionary